Taschen Basic Art is a best selling art collection books, published by Taschen, starting in 1985. Each book looks at a different artist, with a biography, and illustrations of their work. The books are published as affordable hardcover books of 21 x 26 cm. , 78 titles had been published. Similar series entitled Taschen Basic Architecture, Taschen Basic Cinema and Taschen Basic Photographies were started after the success of the Basic Art series.

In the spring of 2014, Taschen's Basic Art series received major criticism in Swedish media for its focus on male artists. The series then consisted of 95 books, only five of which were of female artists. The artists Ditte Ejlerskov and EvaMarie Lindahl highlighted the disparity with an art installation at Malmö Konsthall in Sweden.

See also
 
100 Contemporary Artists A-Z

References

External links
 Taschen Basic Art Series   

Books about visual art
Series of non-fiction books
Taschen books